CG-74339 (ex CG-255) was a wooden-hulled patrol vessel in commission in the fleet of the United States Coast Guard.

History
She was laid down at the Alameda, California shipyard of the A. W. de Young Boat & Shipbuilding Company, one of 203 "Six-Bitters" ordered by the United States Coast Guard, 10 of which were built by de Young. She was designed for long-range picket and patrol duty during Prohibition for postings 20 to 30 miles from shore. She was laid down on 18 August 1924, launched on 25 November 1924, and delivered 26 December 1924. She was commissioned in 1924/1925 as CG-255. By 1943, during World War II, she was designated CG-74339 (the "74" referring to her length of 74 feet 11 inches). She was decommissioned for disposal in 1947.

References

1924 ships
Ships built in Alameda, California
Ships of the United States Coast Guard
Ships built by the A. W. de Young Boat & Shipbuilding Company